War of the Buttons is a 2011 French adventure film directed by Yann Samuell. It is one of two films based on the eponymous novel by Louis Pergaud released in 2011.

Cast 
 Éric Elmosnino as Maître Merlin
 Mathilde Seigner as La mère de Lebrac
 Fred Testot as Le père Simon
 Alain Chabat as Maître Labru

References

External links 

2010s adventure films
French adventure films
Films based on French novels
2010s French films